Lithuanian Liberal Youth (LLJ), is a political youth organization in Lithuania. It is the financially and organisationally independent of any political party. However, some prominent members of LLJ participate in active politics as representatives of political parties.

History
The organisation was unofficially established as Vilniaus liberalaus jaunimo klubas on 12 January 1991 and was officially registered on 1 December 1991. After being affiliated with Lithuanian Liberal Union until 1994, the organisation later decided to become an independent one. Even after this split many members of LLJ as Jonas Čekuolis, Gintaras Steponavičius and Aušrinė Armonaitė were elected to municipal councils and the Seimas as members of Lithuanian Liberal Union, Liberal and Centre Union and Liberal Movement.

Past leaders
Liberal leaders and officials who are alumni of LLJ include:
Current Member of Parliament and Minister of Economics and Innovations Aušrinė Armonaitė
Current Member of Parliament and Minister of Environment Simonas Gentvilas
Current Minister of Culture Simonas Kairys
Current Member of Parliament Ieva Pakarklytė
Former Chairman of the Liberal Movement, Mayor of Vilnius Remigijus Šimašius
Former Minister of Science and Education, current MP Gintaras Steponavičius
Former Chairman of the Liberal Movement, MP and Minister of Transport and Communications Eligijus Masiulis
Councillor of Vilnius City Municipality Deimantė Rimkutė

Structure

Executive
The day-to-day management of the LLJ is in the hands of the LLJ Board, the members of which are:
President: Umberto Masi
Coordinator of Political Affairs: Martynas Baltramaitis
Coordinator of Finances: Vitold Dvorak
Coordinator of Bureau: Justina Golokvoščiūtė
Coordinator of Marketing and Partnership: Valerija Kozikaitė
Coordinator of Communication: Ilona Kumpytė
Coordinator of International Affairs: Izidė Marcinkutė
Coordinator of Events: Darija Šaranina
Coordinator of Education: Žygimantas Šilobritas
Coordinator of Sections: Samanta Venckutė

Sections
Currently the Lithuanian Liberal Youth has 25 local sections. Every section has a local board and organizes regular general meetings, where local board members are elected and policy is decided. Every local member has the right to vote at the local general meetings. The sections are:

Akmenė section (ALJO)
Alytus section (ALJ)
Druskininkai section (DLJ)
Elektrėnai section (ELJ)
Jonava section (JLJ)
Kaišiadorys section (KRLJ)
Kalvarija section (KaLJ)
Kaunas section (association, KLJ)
Kėdainiai section (KėdLiJO)
Kelmė section (KelJO)
Klaipėda section (association, KLJO)
Lentvaris section (LeLiJO)
Marijampolė section (MLJO)
Mažeikiai section (association, MLJ)
Raseiniai section (RLJ)
Rokiškis section (RokLJ)
Panevėžys section (PLJ)
Pilviškiai section (PLJO)
Šiauliai section (association, ŠLJ)
Šilutė section (ŠLJO)
Tauragė section (TLJ)
Telšiai section (association, TLJO)
Utena section (association, ULJ)
Varėna section (VLJ)
Vilnius section (association, VLJO)
Visaginas section (ViLJ)

References

External links 
 www.laisve.lt

Liberalism in Lithuania
1991 establishments in Lithuania
Youth organizations based in Lithuania
Youth wings of liberal parties

de:Liberale Jugend Litauens